Herpetotherinae is a subfamily of falconid birds of prey that includes eight species in two genera Herpetotheres (laughing falcons) and Micrastur (forest falcons). Both genera are found in South America and the subfamily is basal to the other falconid subfamilies where they split off around 30.2 million years ago in the Oligocene epoch. The two herpetotherine genera split around 20 million years ago in the Miocene epoch.

References

 
Birds of prey
Bird subfamilies